Anopheles hermsi is a species of mosquito in the family Culicidae.  It is a known vector of Plasmodium vivax malaria.  An. hermsi have been collected in Southern California.

References

hermsi
Insects described in 1989